Joseph Benjamin Cracknell (born 16 March 2000) is an English cricketer. He made his Twenty20 debut on 21 June 2019, for Middlesex against Leinster Lightning. He made his first-class debut on 11 July 2021, for Middlesex in the 2021 County Championship. He made his List A debut on 25 July 2021, for Middlesex in the 2021 Royal London One-Day Cup.

Cracknell grew up playing at North Middlesex Cricket Club. He later represented Durham University while completing a degree in Sports Science.

References

External links
 

2000 births
Living people
English cricketers
Middlesex cricketers
People from Enfield, London
English cricketers of the 21st century
London Spirit cricketers
Alumni of Durham University